Two-time defending champion Esther Vergeer and her partner Korie Homan defeated Annick Sevenans and Aniek van Koot in the final, 6–2, 6–3 to win the women's doubles wheelchair tennis title at the 2009 French Open. It was their second step towards an eventual Grand Slam.

Jiske Griffioen and Vergeer were the reigning champions, but did not compete together. Griffioen partnered Florence Gravellier, but was defeated in the semifinals by Sevenans and van Koot.

Seeds
 Korie Homan /  Esther Vergeer (champions)
 Florence Gravellier /  Jiske Griffioen (semifinals)

Draw

Finals

External links
Draw

Wheelchair Women's Doubles
French Open, 2009 Women's Doubles